The 2017 Open d'Orléans was a professional tennis tournament played on indoor hard courts. It was the thirteenth edition of the tournament which was part of the 2017 ATP Challenger Tour. It took place in Orléans, France between 25 September and 1 October 2017.

Singles main-draw entrants

Seeds

 1 Rankings are as of 18 September 2017.

Other entrants
The following players received wildcards into the singles main draw:
  Geoffrey Blancaneaux
  Benjamin Bonzi
  Ernests Gulbis
  Paul-Henri Mathieu

The following player received entry into the singles main draw using a protected ranking:
  Igor Sijsling

The following players received entry into the singles main draw as special exempts:
  Danilo Petrović
  Stéphane Robert

The following players received entry from the qualifying draw:
  Guillermo Durán
  Fabien Reboul
  Gleb Sakharov
  Antonio Šančić

The following player received entry as a lucky loser:
  Corentin Denolly

Champions

Singles

 Norbert Gombos def.  Julien Benneteau 6–3, 5–7, 6–2.

Doubles

 Guillermo Durán /  Andrés Molteni def.  Jonathan Eysseric /  Tristan Lamasine 6–3, 6–7(4–7), [13–11].

External links
Official Website

Open d'Orléans
 
Open dOrleans
Open d'Orléans
Open d'Orléans